The 1998–99 Creighton Bluejays men's basketball team represented Creighton University during the 1998–99 NCAA Division I men's basketball season. The Bluejays, led by head coach Dana Altman, played their home games at the Omaha Civic Auditorium. The Jays finished with a 22–9 record, and won the Missouri Valley Conference tournament to earn an automatic bid to the 1999 NCAA tournament.

Roster

Schedule
 
|-
!colspan=9| Regular season

|-
!colspan=9| Missouri Valley Conference tournament

|-
!colspan=9| 1999 NCAA tournament

References

Creighton
Creighton
Creighton Bluejays men's basketball seasons
Creighton Bluejays men's bask
Creighton Bluejays men's bask